Quirico may refer to:

People
Quiricus and Julietta, Catholic saints
Quirico Bernacchi (1914–2006), Italian racing cyclist
Quirico Filopanti (1812–1894), Italian mathematician
Quirico Pignalberi (1891–1982), Italian Roman Catholic priest 
DeWayne Quirico, American professional drummer
Rafael Quirico, former Major League Baseball pitcher

Places
San Quirico d'Orcia, Italian municipality
Serra San Quirico, Italian municipality
Corvino San Quirico, Italian municipality
Quirino Avenue, a lane divided highway in Manila, Philippines
Quiricó Formation, geological formation in Brazil

Others
Santi Quirico e Giulitta, Roman Catholic titular church
Santi Quirico e Giulitta (Genoa), Roman Catholic church in Genoa

See also
 Ciriaco
 San Quirico (disambiguation)

Italian masculine given names